Martin Abellana (1904–1989) was a Filipino Visayan writer. He was a teacher by profession. In the years 1956 to 1958, he was president of the LUDABI, a group of writers in Cebuano. His novels are characterized by a concern for the working class. Abellana is one of the Cebuano writers featured by National Artist Resil Mojares in his 1975 book “Cebuano Literature.”

Novels
 Kaulit sa Kalipay
 Ang Kalayo sa Sulad
 Tulisok sa Tanlag
 Basuni sa Katingala
 Awit sa Gugma
 Kinabuhi

References
 

1904 births
1989 deaths
Visayan writers
Cebuano writers
Filipino novelists
Cebuano people
20th-century novelists
Filipino schoolteachers
20th-century Filipino educators
20th-century Filipino writers
Date of birth missing
Date of death missing